Laevilitorina pygmaea is a species of sea snail, a marine gastropod mollusk in the family Littorinidae, the winkles or periwinkles.

Distribution

Description 
The maximum recorded shell length is 2.5 mm.

Habitat 
Minimum recorded depth is 252 m. Maximum recorded depth is 310 m.

References

Littorinidae
Gastropods described in 1886